Theodor Körner may refer to:

 Theodor Körner (author) (1791–1813), German poet and soldier
 Theodor Körner (opera), premiered in 1872, based on an episode in the life of the German poet and soldier
 Theodor Körner (president) (1873–1957), president of Austria 1951–1957
 Theodor Körner Prize, a set of annual Austrian awards
  (1863–1933), German merchant and politician